Renal cell carcinoma (RCC) is a kidney cancer that originates in the lining of the proximal convoluted tubule, a part of the very small tubes in the kidney that transport primary urine. RCC is the most common type of kidney cancer in adults, responsible for approximately 90–95% of cases. RCC occurrence shows a male predominance over women with a ratio of 1.5:1. RCC most commonly occurs between 6th and 7th decade of life.

Initial treatment is most commonly either partial or complete removal of the affected kidney(s). Where the cancer has not metastasised (spread to other organs) or burrowed deeper into the tissues of the kidney, the five-year survival rate is 65–90%, but this is lowered considerably when the cancer has spread.

The body is remarkably good at hiding the symptoms and as a result people with RCC often have advanced disease by the time it is discovered. The initial symptoms of RCC often include blood in the urine (occurring in 40% of affected persons at the time they first seek medical attention), flank pain (40%), a mass in the abdomen or flank (25%), weight loss (33%), fever (20%), high blood pressure (20%), night sweats and generally feeling unwell. When RCC metastasises, it most commonly spreads to the lymph nodes, lungs, liver, adrenal glands, brain or bones. Immunotherapy and targeted therapy have improved the outlook for metastatic RCC.

RCC is also associated with a number of paraneoplastic syndromes (PNS) which are conditions caused by either the hormones produced by the tumour or by the body's attack on the tumour and are present in about 20% of those with RCC. These syndromes most commonly affect tissues which have not been invaded by the cancer. The most common PNSs seen in people with RCC are: high blood calcium levels, high red blood cell count, high platelet count and secondary amyloidosis.

Signs and symptoms 
Historically, medical practitioners expected a person to present with three findings. This classic triad is 1: haematuria, which is when there is blood present in the urine, 2: flank pain, which is pain on the side of the body between the hip and ribs, and 3: an abdominal mass, similar to bloating but larger. It is now known that this classic triad of symptoms only occurs in 10–15% of cases, and is usually indicative that the renal cell carcinoma (RCC) is in an advanced stage. Today, RCC is often asymptomatic (meaning few to no symptoms) and is generally detected incidentally when a person is being examined for other ailments.

Other signs and symptom may include haematuria; loin pain; abdominal mass; malaise, which is a general feeling of unwellness; weight loss and/or loss of appetite; anaemia resulting from depression of erythropoietin; erythrocytosis (increased production of red blood cells) due to increased erythropoietin secretion; varicocele, which is seen in males as an enlargement of the pampiniform plexus of veins draining the testis (more often the left testis) hypertension (high blood pressure) resulting from secretion of renin by the tumour; hypercalcemia, which is elevation of calcium levels in the blood; sleep disturbance or night sweats; recurrent fevers; and chronic fatigue.

Risk factors

Lifestyle 
The greatest risk factors for RCC are lifestyle-related; smoking, obesity and hypertension (high blood pressure) have been estimated to account for up to 50% of cases.
Occupational exposure to some chemicals such as asbestos, cadmium, lead, chlorinated solvents, petrochemicals and PAH (polycyclic aromatic hydrocarbon) has been examined by multiple studies with inconclusive results.
Another suspected risk factor is the long term use of non-steroidal anti-inflammatory drugs (NSAIDS).

Finally, studies have found that women who have had a hysterectomy are at more than double the risk of developing RCC than those who have not. Moderate alcohol consumption, on the other hand, has been shown to have a protective effect.

Genetics 
Hereditary factors have a minor impact on individual susceptibility with immediate relatives of people with RCC having a two to fourfold increased risk of developing the condition. Other genetically linked conditions also increase the risk of RCC, including hereditary papillary renal carcinoma, hereditary leiomyomatosis, Birt–Hogg–Dube syndrome, hyperparathyroidism-jaw tumor syndrome, familial papillary thyroid carcinoma, von Hippel–Lindau disease and sickle cell disease.

The most significant disease affecting risk however is not genetically linked – patients with acquired cystic disease of the kidney requiring dialysis are 30 times more likely than the general population to develop RCC.

Pathophysiology 
The tumour arises from the cells of the proximal renal tubular epithelium. It is considered an adenocarcinoma. There are two subtypes: sporadic (that is, non-hereditary) and hereditary. Both such subtypes are associated with mutations in the short-arm of chromosome 3, with the implicated genes being either tumour suppressor genes (VHL and TSC) or oncogenes (like c-Met).

Diagnosis 

The first steps taken to diagnose this condition are consideration of the signs and symptoms, and a medical history (the detailed medical review of past health state) to evaluate any risk factors. Based on the symptoms presented, a range of biochemical tests (using blood and/or urine samples) may also be considered as part of the screening process to provide sufficient quantitative analysis of any differences in electrolytes, kidney and liver function, and blood clotting times. Upon physical examination, palpation of the abdomen may reveal the presence of a mass or an organ enlargement.

Although this disease lacks characterization in the early stages of tumor development, considerations based on diverse clinical manifestations, as well as resistance to radiation and chemotherapy are important. The main diagnostic tools for detecting renal cell carcinoma are ultrasound, computed tomography (CT) scanning and magnetic resonance imaging (MRI) of the kidneys.

Classification 
Renal cell carcinoma (RCC) is not a single entity, but rather a collection of different types of tumours, each derived from the various parts of the nephron (epithelium or renal tubules) and possessing distinct genetic characteristics, histological features, and, to some extent, clinical phenotypes.

Array-based karyotyping can be used to identify characteristic chromosomal aberrations in renal tumors with challenging morphology. Array-based karyotyping performs well on paraffin embedded tumours and is amenable to routine clinical use. See also Virtual Karyotype for CLIA certified laboratories offering array-based karyotyping of solid tumours.

The 2004 World Health Organization (WHO) classification of genitourinary tumours recognizes over 40 subtypes of renal neoplasms. Since the publication of the latest iteration of the WHO classification in 2004, several novel renal tumour subtypes have been described:
 Clear cell papillary renal cell carcinoma and clear cell renal cell carcinoma with smooth muscle stroma
 Mucinous tubular and spindle cell carcinoma (MTSCC) 
 Multilocular cystic clear cell renal cell carcinoma
 Tubulocystic renal cell carcinoma
 Thyroid-like follicular renal cell carcinoma
 Acquired cystic kidney disease-associated renal cell carcinoma
 Renal cell carcinoma with t(6;11) translocation (TFEB)
 Hybrid oncocytoma/chromophobe renal cell carcinoma
 Hereditary leiomyomatosis and renal cell carcinoma (HLRCC)

Laboratory tests 
Laboratory tests are generally conducted when the patient presents with signs and symptoms that may be characteristic of kidney impairment. They are not primarily used to diagnose kidney cancer, due to its asymptomatic nature and are generally found incidentally during tests for other illnesses such as gallbladder disease.  In other words, these cancers are not detected usually because they do not cause pain or discomfort when they are discovered. Laboratory analysis can provide an assessment on the overall health of the patient and can provide information in determining the staging and degree of metastasis to other parts of the body (if a renal lesion has been identified) before treatment is given.

Urine analysis 
The presence of blood in urine is a common presumptive sign of renal cell carcinoma. The haemoglobin of the blood causes the urine to be rusty, brown or red in colour. Alternatively, urinalysis can test for sugar, protein and bacteria which can also serve as indicators for cancer. A complete blood cell count can also provide additional information regarding the severity and spreading of the cancer.

Complete blood cell count 
The CBC provides a quantified measure of the different cells in the whole blood sample from the patient. Such cells examined for in this test include red blood cells (erythrocytes), white blood cells (leukocytes) and platelets (thrombocytes). A common sign of renal cell carcinoma is anaemia whereby the patient exhibits deficiency in red blood cells. CBC tests are vital as a screening tool for examination the health of patient prior to surgery. Inconsistencies with platelet counts are also common amongst these cancer patients and further coagulation tests, including erythrocyte sedimentation rate (ESR), prothrombin time (PT), activated partial thromboplastin time (APTT) should be considered.

Blood chemistry 
Blood chemistry tests are conducted if renal cell carcinoma is suspected as cancer has the potential to elevate levels of particular chemicals in blood. For example, liver enzymes such as aspartate aminotransferase (AST) and alanine aminotransferase (ALT) are found to be at abnormally high levels. The staging of the cancer can also be determined by abnormal elevated levels of calcium, which suggests that the cancer may have metastasised to the bones. In this case, a doctor should be prompted for a CT scan. Blood chemistry tests also assess the overall function of the kidneys and can allow the doctor to decide upon further radiological tests.

Radiology 
The characteristic appearance of renal cell carcinoma (RCC) is a solid renal lesion which disturbs the renal contour. It will frequently have an irregular or lobulated margin and may be seen as a lump on the lower pelvic or abdomen region. Traditionally, 85 to 90% of solid renal masses will turn out to be RCC but cystic renal masses may also be due to RCC. However, the advances of diagnostic modalities are able to incidentally diagnose a great proportion of patients with renal lesions that may appear to be small in size and of benign state. Ten percent of RCC will contain calcifications, and some contain macroscopic fat (likely due to invasion and encasement of the perirenal fat).

Deciding on the benign or malignant nature of the renal mass on the basis of its localized size is an issue as renal cell carcinoma may also be cystic. As there are several benign cystic renal lesions (simple renal cyst, haemorrhagic renal cyst, multilocular cystic nephroma, polycystic kidney disease), it may occasionally be difficult for the radiologist to differentiate a benign cystic lesion from a malignant one.  The Bosniak classification system for cystic renal lesions classifies them into groups that are benign and those that need surgical resection, based on specific imaging features.

The main imaging tests performed in order to identify renal cell carcinoma are pelvic and abdominal CT scans, ultrasound tests of the kidneys (ultrasonography), MRI scans, intravenous pyelogram (IVP) or renal angiography. Among these main diagnostic tests, other radiologic tests such as excretory urography, positron-emission tomography (PET) scanning, ultrasonography, arteriography, venography, and bone scanning can also be used to aid in the evaluation of staging renal masses and to differentiate non-malignant tumours from malignant tumours.

Computed tomography 
Contrast-enhanced computed tomography (CT) scanning is routinely used to determine the stage of the renal cell carcinoma in the abdominal and pelvic regions. CT scans have the potential to distinguish solid masses from cystic masses and may provide information on the localization, stage or spread of the cancer to other organs of the patient. Key parts of the human body which are examined for metastatic involvement of renal cell carcinoma may include the renal vein, lymph node and the involvement of the inferior vena cava.  According to a study conducted by Sauk et al., multidetector CT imaging characteristics have applications in diagnosing patients with clear renal cell carcinoma by depicting the differences of these cells at the cytogenic level.

Ultrasound 
Ultrasonographic examination can be useful in evaluating questionable asymptomatic kidney tumours and cystic renal lesions if computed tomography imaging is inconclusive. This safe and non-invasive radiologic procedure uses high frequency sound waves to generate an interior image of the body on a computer monitor. The image generated by the ultrasound can help diagnose renal cell carcinoma based on the differences of sound reflections on the surface of organs and the abnormal tissue masses. Essentially, ultrasound tests can determine whether the composition of the kidney mass is mainly solid or filled with fluid.

A percutaneous biopsy can be performed by a radiologist using ultrasound or computed tomography to guide sampling of the tumour for the purpose of diagnosis by pathology. However this is not routinely performed because when the typical imaging features of renal cell carcinoma are present, the possibility of an incorrectly negative result together with the risk of a medical complication to the patient may make it unfavourable from a risk-benefit perspective.  However, biopsy tests for molecular analysis to distinguish benign from malignant renal tumours is of investigative interest.

Magnetic resonance imaging 
Magnetic resonance imaging (MRI) scans provide an image of the soft tissues in the body using radio waves and strong magnets. MRI can be used instead of CT if the patient exhibits an allergy to the contrast media administered for the test. Sometimes prior to the MRI scan, an intravenous injection of a contrasting material called gadolinium is given to allow for a more detailed image. Patients on dialysis or those who have renal insufficiency should avoid this contrasting material as it may induce a rare, yet severe, side effect known as nephrogenic systemic fibrosis.  A bone scan or brain imaging is not routinely performed unless signs or symptoms suggest potential metastatic involvement of these areas.
MRI scans should also be considered to evaluate tumour extension which has grown in major blood vessels, including the vena cava, in the abdomen. MRI can be used to observe the possible spread of cancer to the brain or spinal cord should the patient present symptoms that suggest this might be the case.

Intravenous pyelogram 
Intravenous pyelogram (IVP) is a useful procedure in detecting the presence of abnormal renal mass in the urinary tract. This procedure involves the injection of a contrasting dye into the arm of the patient. The dye travels from the blood stream and into the kidneys which in time, passes into the kidneys and bladder. This test is not necessary if a CT or MRI scan has been conducted.

Renal angiography 
Renal angiography uses the same principle as IVP, as this type of X-ray also uses a contrasting dye. This radiologic test is important in diagnosing renal cell carcinoma as an aid for examining blood vessels in the kidneys. This diagnostic test relies on the contrasting agent which is injected in the renal artery to be absorbed by the cancerous cells. The contrasting dye provides a clearer outline of abnormally-oriented blood vessels believed to be involved with the tumour.  This is imperative for surgeons as it allows the patient's blood vessels to be mapped prior to operation.

Staging 
The staging of renal cell carcinoma is the most important factor in predicting its prognosis. Staging can follow the TNM staging system, where the size and extent of the tumour (T), involvement of lymph nodes (N) and metastases (M) are classified separately. Also, it can use overall stage grouping into stage I–IV, with the 1997 revision of AJCC described below:

At diagnosis, 30% of renal cell carcinomas have spread to the ipsilateral renal vein, and 5–10% have continued into the inferior vena cava.

Histopathology 

The gross and microscopic appearance of renal cell carcinomas is highly variable. The renal cell carcinoma may present reddened areas where blood vessels have bled, and cysts containing watery fluids. The body of the tumour shows large blood vessels that have walls composed of cancerous cells.
Gross examination often shows a yellowish, multilobulated tumor in the renal cortex, which frequently contains zones of necrosis, haemorrhage and scarring. In a microscopic context, there are four major histologic subtypes of renal cell cancer: clear cell (conventional RCC, 75%), papillary (15%), chromophobic (5%), and collecting duct (2%). Sarcomatoid changes (morphology and patterns of IHC that mimic sarcoma, spindle cells) can be observed within any RCC subtype and are associated with more aggressive clinical course and worse prognosis.  Under light microscopy, these tumour cells can exhibit papillae, tubules or nests, and are quite large, atypical, and polygonal.

Recent studies have brought attention to the close association of the type of cancerous cells to the aggressiveness of the condition. Some studies suggest that these cancerous cells accumulate glycogen and lipids, their cytoplasm appear "clear", the nuclei remain in the middle of the cells, and the cellular membrane is evident.  Some cells may be smaller, with eosinophilic cytoplasm, resembling normal tubular cells. The stroma is reduced, but well vascularised. The tumour compresses the surrounding parenchyma, producing a pseudocapsule.

The most common cell type exhibited by renal cell carcinoma is the clear cell, which is named by the dissolving of the cells' high lipid content in the cytoplasm. The clear cells are thought to be the least likely to spread and usually respond more favourably to treatment. However, most of the tumours contain a mixture of cells. The most aggressive stage of renal cancer is believed to be the one in which the tumour is mixed, containing both clear and granular cells.

The recommended histologic grading schema for RCC is the Fuhrman system (1982), which is an assessment based on the microscopic morphology of a neoplasm with haematoxylin and eosin (H&E staining). This system categorises renal cell carcinoma with grades 1, 2, 3, 4 based on nuclear characteristics. The details of the Fuhrman grading system for RCC are shown below:

Nuclear grade is believed to be one of the most imperative prognostic factors in patients with renal cell carcinoma. However, a study by Delahunt et al. (2007) has shown that the Fuhrman grading is ideal for clear cell carcinoma but may not be appropriate for chromophobe renal cell carcinomas and that the staging of cancer (accomplished by CT scan) is a more favourable predictor of the prognosis of this disease. In relation to renal cancer staging, the Heidelberg classification system of renal tumours was introduced in 1976 as a means of more completely correlating the histopathological features with the identified genetic defects.

Prevention
The risk of renal cell carcinoma can be reduced by maintaining a normal body weight.

Management 

The type of treatment depends on multiple factors and the individual, some of which include the stage of renal cell carcinoma (organs and parts of the body affected/unaffected), type of renal cell carcinoma, pre-existing or comorbid conditions and overall health and age of the person.
Every form of treatment has both risks and benefits; a health care professional will provide the best options that suit the individual circumstances.

If it has spread outside of the kidneys, often into the lymph nodes, the lungs or the main vein of the kidney, then multiple therapies are used including surgery and medications. RCC is resistant to chemotherapy and radiotherapy in most cases but does respond well to immunotherapy with interleukin-2 or interferon-alpha, biologic, or targeted therapy. In early-stage cases, cryotherapy and surgery are the preferred options.

Active surveillance 
Active surveillance or "watchful waiting" is becoming more common as small renal masses or tumours are being detected and also within the older generation when surgery is not always suitable. Active surveillance involves completing various diagnostic procedures, tests and imaging to monitor the progression of the RCC before embarking on a more high risk treatment option like surgery. In the elderly, patients with co-morbidities, and in poor surgical candidates, this is especially useful.

Surgery 
Different procedures may be most appropriate, depending on circumstances.

The recommended treatment for renal cell cancer may be nephrectomy or partial nephrectomy, surgical removal of all or part of the kidney. This may include some of the surrounding organs or tissues or lymph nodes. If cancer is only in the kidneys, which is about 60% of cases, it can be cured roughly 90% of the time with surgery.

Small renal tumors (< 4 cm) are treated increasingly by partial nephrectomy when possible. Most of these small renal masses manifest indolent biological behavior with excellent prognosis. Nephron-sparing partial nephrectomy is used when the tumor is small (less than 4 cm in diameter) or when the patient has other medical concerns such as diabetes or hypertension. The partial nephrectomy involves the removal of the affected tissue only, sparing the rest of the kidney, Gerota's fascia and the regional lymph nodes. This allows for more renal preservation as compared to the radical nephrectomy, and this can have positive long-term health benefits.  Larger and more complex tumors can also be treated with partial nephrectomy by surgeons with a lot of kidney surgery experience.

Surgical nephrectomy may be "radical" if the procedure removes the entire affected kidney including Gerota's fascia, the adrenal gland which is on the same side as the affected kidney, and the regional retroperitoneal lymph nodes, all at the same time. This method, although severe, is effective. But it is not always appropriate, as it is a major surgery that contains the risk of complication both during and after the surgery and can have a longer recovery time.  It is important to note that the other kidney must be fully functional, and this technique is most often used when there is a large tumour present in only one kidney.

In cases where the tumor has spread into the renal vein, inferior vena cava, and possibly the right atrium, this portion of the tumor can be surgically removed, as well. When the tumor involved the inferior vena cava, it is important to classify which parts of the vena cava are involved and to plan accordingly, as sometimes complete resection will involve an incision into the chest with increased morbidity. For this reason, Dr. Gaetano Ciancio adapted liver mobilization techniques from liver transplant to address retrohepatic or even suprahepatic inferior vena caval thrombus associated with renal tumors. With this technique, the whole abdominal inferior vena cava is able to be mobilized. This facilitates milking of the tumor down below the major hepatic veins by the surgeon's fingers, bypassing the need for a thoracoabdominal incision or cardiopulmonary bypass.  In cases of known metastases, surgical resection of the kidney ("cytoreductive nephrectomy") may improve survival, as well as resection of a solitary metastatic lesion.  Kidneys are sometimes embolized prior to surgery to minimize blood loss.

Surgery is increasingly performed via laparoscopic techniques.  Commonly referred to as key hole surgery, this surgery does not have the large incisions seen in a classically performed radical or partial nephrectomy, but still successfully removes either all or part of the kidney. Laparoscopic surgery is associated with shorter stays in the hospital and quicker recovery time but there are still risks associated with the surgical procedure. These have the advantage of being less of a burden for the patient and the disease-free survival is comparable to that of open surgery.  For small exophytic lesions that do not extensively involve the major vessels or urinary collecting system, a partial nephrectomy (also referred to as "nephron sparing surgery") can be performed. This may involve temporarily stopping blood flow to the kidney while the mass is removed as well as renal cooling with an ice slush. Mannitol can also be administered to help limit damage to the kidney.  This is usually done through an open incision although smaller lesions can be done laparoscopically with or without robotic assistance.

Laparoscopic cryotherapy can also be done on smaller lesions.  Typically a biopsy is taken at the time of treatment. Intraoperative ultrasound may be used to help guide placement of the freezing probes. Two freeze/thaw cycles are then performed to kill the tumor cells.  As the tumor is not removed followup is more complicated (see below) and overall disease-free rates are not as good as those obtained with surgical removal.

Surgery for metastatic disease: If metastatic disease is present surgical treatment may still a viable option. Radical and partial nephrectomy can still occur, and in some cases, if the metastasis is small this can also be surgically removed. This depends on what stage of growth and how far the disease has spread.

Percutaneous ablative therapies 
Percutaneous ablation therapies use image-guidance by radiologists to treat localized tumors if a surgical procedure is not a good option.  Although the use of laparoscopic surgical techniques for complete nephrectomies has reduced some of the risks associated with surgery, surgery of any sort in some cases will still not be feasible. For example, the elderly, people who already have severe renal dysfunction, or people who have several comorbidities, surgery of any sort is not warranted.

A probe is placed through the skin and into the tumor using real-time imaging of both the probe tip and the tumor by computed tomography, ultrasound, or even magnetic resonance imaging guidance, and then destroying the tumor with heat (radiofrequency ablation) or cold (cryotherapy). These modalities are at a disadvantage compared to traditional surgery in that pathologic confirmation of complete tumor destruction is not possible. Therefore, long-term follow-up is crucial to assess completeness of tumour ablation. Ideally, percutaneous ablation is restricted to tumours smaller than 3.5 cm and to guide the treatment. However, there are some cases where ablation can be used on tumors that are larger.

The two main types of ablation techniques that are used for renal cell carcinoma are radio frequency ablation and cryoablation.

Radio frequency ablation  uses an electrode probe which is inserted into the affected tissue, to send radio frequencies to the tissue to generate heat through the friction of water molecules. The heat destroys the tumor tissue.  Cell death will generally occur within minutes of being exposed to temperatures above 50 °C.

Cryoablation also involves the insertion of a probe into the affected area, however, cold is used to kill the tumor instead of heat. The probe is cooled with chemical fluids which are very cold. The freezing temperatures cause the tumor cells to die by causing osmotic dehydration, which pulls the water out of the cell destroying the enzyme, organelles, cell membrane and freezing the cytoplasm.

Targeted drugs 
Cancers often grow in an unbridled fashion because they are able to evade the immune system. Immunotherapy is a method that activates the person's immune system and uses it to their own advantage.  It was developed after observing that in some cases there was spontaneous regression. Immunotherapy capitalises on this phenomenon and aims to build up a person's immune response to cancer cells.

Other targeted therapy medications inhibit growth factors that have been shown to promote the growth and spread of tumours. Most of these medications were approved within the past ten years. These treatments are:

 Nivolumab
 Axitinib
 Sunitinib
 Cabozantinib
 Everolimus
 Lenvatinib
 Pazopanib
 Bevacizumab
 Sorafenib
 Tivozanib
 Temsirolimus
 Interleukin-2 (IL-2) has produced "durable remissions" in a small number of patients, but with substantial toxicity.
 Interferon-α

For patients with metastatic cancer, sunitinib probably results in more progression of the cancer than pembrolizumab, axitinib and avelumab. In comparison to pembrolizumab and axitinib, it probably results in more death, but it may slightly reduce serious unwanted effects. When compared with combinations of immunotherapy (nivolumab and ipilimumab), sunitinib may lead to more progression and serious effects. There may be little to no difference in progression, survival and serious effects between pazopanib and sunitib.

Activity has also been reported for ipilimumab but it is not an approved medication for renal cancer.

More medications are expected to become available in the near future as several clinical trials are currently being conducted for new targeted treatments, including: atezolizumab, varlilumab, durvalumab, avelumab, LAG525, MBG453, TRC105, and savolitinib.

Chemotherapy 
Chemotherapy and radiotherapy are not as successful in the case of RCC. RCC is resistant in most cases but there is about a 4–5% success rate, but this is often short-lived with more tumours and growths developing later.

Adjuvant and neoadjuvant therapy 
Adjuvant therapy, which refers to therapy given after a primary surgery, has not been found to be beneficial in renal cell cancer. Conversely, neoadjuvant therapy is administered before the intended primary or main treatment. In some cases neoadjuvant therapy has been shown to decrease the size and stage of the RCC to then allow it to be surgically removed. This is a new form of treatment and the effectiveness of this approach is still being assessed in clinical trials.

Metastasis 
Metastatic renal cell carcinoma (mRCC) is the spread of the primary renal cell carcinoma from the kidney to other organs. 25–30% of people have this metastatic spread by the time they are diagnosed with renal cell carcinoma. This high proportion is explained by the fact that clinical signs are generally mild until the disease progresses to a more severe state. The most common sites for metastasis are the lymph nodes, lung, bones, liver and brain. How this spread affects the staging of the disease and hence prognosis is discussed in the "Diagnosis" and "Prognosis" sections.

MRCC has a poor prognosis compared to other cancers although average survival times have increased in the last few years due to treatment advances. Average survival time in 2008 for the metastatic form of the disease was under a year and by 2013 this improved to an average of 22 months. Despite this improvement the five-year survival rate for mRCC remains under 10%  and 20–25%  of patients remain unresponsive to all treatments and in these cases, the disease has a rapid progression.

The available treatments for RCC discussed in the "Treatment" section are also relevant for the metastatic form of the disease. Options include interleukin-2 which is a standard therapy for advanced renal cell carcinoma. From 2007 to 2013, seven new treatments have been approved specifically for mRCC (sunitinib, temsirolimus, bevacizumab, sorafenib, everolimus, pazopanib and axitinib). These new treatments are based on the fact that renal cell carcinomas are very vascular tumors – they contain a large number of blood vessels. The drugs aim to inhibit the growth of new blood vessels in the tumors, hence slowing growth and in some cases reducing the size of the tumors.
Side effects unfortunately are quite common with these treatments and include:
 Gastrointestinal effects – nausea, vomiting, diarrhea, anorexia
 Respiratory effects – coughing, dyspnea (difficulty breathing)
 Cardiovascular effects – hypertension (high blood pressure)
 Neurological effects – intracranial hemorrhage (bleeding into the brain), thrombosis (blood clots) in the brain
 Effects on the skin and mucus membranes – rashes, hand-foot syndrome, stomatitis
 Bone marrow suppression – resulting in reduced white blood cells, increasing the risk of infections plus anemia and reduced platelets
 Renal effects – impaired kidney function
 Fatigue.

Radiotherapy and chemotherapy are more commonly used in the metastatic form of RCC to target the secondary tumors in the bones, liver, brain and other organs. While not curative, these treatments do provide relief for symptoms associated with the spread of tumors.

Prognosis 
The prognosis is influenced by several factors, including tumour size, degree of invasion and metastasis, histologic type, and nuclear grade. Staging is the most important factor in the outcome of renal cell cancer. The following numbers are based on patients first diagnosed in 2001 and 2002 by the National Cancer Data Base:

A Korean study estimated a disease-specific overall five-year survival rate of 85%. Taken as a whole, if the disease is limited to the kidney, only 20–30% develop metastatic disease after nephrectomy. More specific subsets show a five-year survival rate of around 90–95% for tumors less than 4 cm. For larger tumors confined to the kidney without venous invasion, survival is still relatively good at 80–85%. For tumors that extend through the renal capsule and out of the local fascial investments, the survivability reduces to near 60%. Factors as general health and fitness or the severity of their symptoms impact the survival rates. For instance, younger people (among 20–40 years old) have a better outcome despite having more symptoms at presentation, possibly due to lower rates spread of cancer to the lymph nodes (stage III).

Histological grade is related to the aggressiveness of the cancer, and it is classified in 4 grades, with 1 having the best prognosis (five-year survival over 89%), and 4 with the worst prognosis (46% of five-year survival).

Some people have the renal cell cancer detected before they have symptoms (incidentally) because of the CT scan (Computed Tomography Imaging) or ultrasound. Incidentally diagnosed renal cell cancer (no symptoms) differs in outlook from those diagnosed after presenting symptoms of renal cell carcinoma or metastasis. The five-year survival rate was higher for incidental than for symptomatic tumours: 85.3% versus 62.5%. Incidental lesions were significantly lower stage than those that cause symptoms, since 62.1% patients with incidental renal cell carcinoma were observed with Stage I lesions, against 23% were found with symptomatic renal cell carcinoma.

If it has metastasized to the lymph nodes, the five-year survival is around 5% to 15%. For metastatic renal cell carcinoma, factors which may present a poor prognosis include a low Karnofsky performance-status score (a standard way of measuring functional impairment in patients with cancer), a low haemoglobin level, a high level of serum lactate dehydrogenase, and a high corrected level of serum calcium. For non-metastatic cases, the Leibovich scoring algorithm may be used to predict post-operative disease progression.

Renal cell carcinoma is one of the cancers most strongly associated with paraneoplastic syndromes, most often due to ectopic hormone production by the tumour. The treatment for these complications of RCC is generally limited beyond treating the underlying cancer.

Epidemiology 
The incidence of the disease varies according to geographic, demographic and, to a lesser extent, hereditary factors. There are some known risk factors, however the significance of other potential risk factors remains more controversial. The incidence of the cancer has been increasing in frequency worldwide at a rate of approximately 2–3% per decade until the last few years where the number of new cases has stabilised.

The incidence of RCC varies between sexes, ages, races and geographic location around the world. Men have a higher incidence than women (approximately 1.6:1) and the vast majority are diagnosed after 65 years of age. Asians reportedly have a significantly lower incidence of RCC than whites and while African countries have the lowest reported incidences, African Americans have the highest incidence of the population in the United States. Developed countries have a higher incidence than developing countries, with the highest rates found in North America, Europe and Australia / New Zealand.

History 
Daniel Sennert made the first reference suggesting a tumour arising in the kidney in his text Practicae Medicinae, first published in 1613.

Miril published the earliest unequivocal case of renal carcinoma in 1810. He described the case of Françoise Levelly, a 35-year-old woman, who presented to Brest Civic Hospital on April 6, 1809, supposedly in the late stages of pregnancy.

Koenig published the first classification of renal tumours based on macroscopic morphology in 1826. Koenig divided the tumors into scirrhous, steatomatous, fungoid and medullary forms.

Hypernephroma controversy 

Following the classification of the tumour, researchers attempted to identify the tissue of origin for renal carcinoma.

The pathogenesis of renal epithelial tumours was debated for decades. The debate was initiated by Paul Grawitz when in 1883, he published his observations on the morphology of small, yellow renal tumours. Grawitz concluded that only alveolar tumours were of adrenal origin, whereas papillary tumours were derived from renal tissue.

In 1893, Paul Sudeck challenged the theory postulated by Grawitz by publishing descriptions of renal tumours in which he identified atypical features within renal tubules and noted a gradation of these atypical features between the tubules and neighboring malignant tumour. In 1894, Otto Lubarsch, who supported the theory postulated by Grawitz coined the term hypernephroid tumor, which was amended to hypernephroma by Felix Victor Birch-Hirschfeld to describe these tumours.

Vigorous criticism of Grawitz was provided by Oskar Stoerk in 1908, who considered the adrenal origin of renal tumours to be unproved. Despite the compelling arguments against the theory postulated by Grawitz, the term hypernephroma, with its associated adrenal connotation, persisted in the literature.

Foot and Humphreys, and Foote et al. introduced the term Renal Celled Carcinoma to emphasize a renal tubular origin for these tumours. Their designation was slightly altered by Fetter to the now widely accepted term Renal Cell Carcinoma.

Convincing evidence to settle the debate was offered by Oberling et al. in 1959 who studied the ultrastructure of clear cells from eight renal carcinomas. They found that the tumour cell cytoplasm contained numerous mitochondria and deposits of glycogen and fat. They identified cytoplasmic membranes inserted perpendicularly onto the basement membrane with occasional cells containing microvilli along the free borders. They concluded that these features indicated that the tumours arose from the epithelial cells of the renal convoluted tubule, thus finally settling one of the most debated issues in tumour pathology.

See also 
 Stauffer syndrome
 Knudson hypothesis
 Interleukin-2
 Kidney cancer
 Rapamycin
 Vinblastine
 Dysuria
 Interferon

References

External links 

Kidney cancer
Medical triads